Samuel Brunton (born 20 February 1990) is a New Zealand rugby league player. He is a Cook Islands international.

Early years
Brunton was a Howick Hornets and Mangere East Hawks junior.

Playing career
Brunton made his National Rugby League debut on 17 April 2010 against the Canberra Raiders. He appeared four times for the Roosters in the 2010 season, until he was sacked from the club after he defecated in a hotel room in Townsville, Queensland, in early September.

International career
Brunton made his Cook Islands debut against Fiji in the 2009 Pacific Cup.

Brunton played for 'the Kukis' in the 2013 Rugby League World Cup

References

External links
NRL profile

1990 births
New Zealand rugby league players
New Zealand sportspeople of Cook Island descent
Cook Islands national rugby league team players
Sydney Roosters players
Howick Hornets players
Mangere East Hawks players
Rugby league hookers
Rugby league locks
Living people